Elizabeth Ada Bronson (November 17, 1906 – October 19, 1971) was an American film and television actress who began her career during the silent film era.

Early years 
Bronson was born in Trenton, New Jersey, to Frank and Nellie Smith Bronson. She moved to East Orange, New Jersey and attended East Orange High School until she "convinced her parents to let her move to California to aid her career in films." Subsequently, the entire family moved to California.

Film career
Bronson began her film career at the age of 16 with a bit part in Anna Ascends. At 17, she was interviewed by J. M. Barrie, author of Peter Pan. Although the role had been sought by such established actresses as Gloria Swanson and Mary Pickford, Barrie personally chose Bronson to play the lead in the film adaptation of his work, which was released in 1924. She appeared alongside actresses Mary Brian (Wendy Darling) and Esther Ralston (Mrs. Darling), both of whom remained lifelong friends.

Bronson had a major role, that of Mary, mother of Jesus, in the 1925 silent film adaptation of Ben-Hur. In 1925, she starred in another Barrie story, A Kiss for Cinderella, an artfully made film that failed at the box office. She made a successful transition into sound films with The Singing Fool (1928), co-starring Al Jolson. She appeared in the sequel, Sonny Boy, with Davey Lee in 1929. She was the leading lady opposite Jack Benny in the romantic drama The Medicine Man (1930).

Bronson continued acting until 1933 when she married Ludwig Lauerhass, "a well‐to‐do North Carolinian", with whom she had one child, Ludwig Lauerhass, Jr. She did not appear in films again until Yodelin' Kid from Pine Ridge (1937) starring Gene Autry.  In the 1960s, she appeared in episodic television and feature films. Her last role was an uncredited part in the television biopic Evel Knievel (1971).

Bronson, the media, and Douglas Fairbanks, Jr
Bronson was reclusive with the press, but received attention after being seen with Douglas Fairbanks, Jr. He had his first boyhood crush on her, as he remembered in his autobiography The Salad Days:

Another important picture had just started. It was Peter Pan, directed by a clever caricature of a wildly temperamental movie director, Herbert Brenon. After exhaustive tests, Betty Bronson, a pretty and gifted girl in her middle teens, was given this famous role... I fell for Betty! It was my first intensely juvenile, deep-sighs-and-bad-sonnets love. It was not fully requited. She only flirted with me. My rival was a fellow in his twenties, a newspaperman who was to become one of New York's most respected theater critics, Richard Watts, Jr.  ...In any event, I was so smitten with Betty, I could think of little else, except when I could call on her, even though her overprotective mother was always just in the next room.

It is known that Bronson kept all Fairbanks' letters and spoke of him fondly until her death.

Death
On October 19, 1971, Bronson died after a protracted illness in Pasadena, California, and was interred at Forest Lawn Memorial Park in Glendale, California.

Papers
The UCLA Library Special Collections department houses the "Betty Bronson papers, 1920-1970", containing "materials related to Bronson's career and includes clippings, photographs, correspondence, scrapbooks, and personal and professional ephemera."

Filmography

References

External links

Photographs and literature

Actresses from New Jersey
American film actresses
American silent film actresses
American television actresses
Burials at Forest Lawn Memorial Park (Glendale)
Actors from East Orange, New Jersey
Actors from Trenton, New Jersey
East Orange High School alumni
1906 births
1971 deaths
20th-century American actresses
Paramount Pictures contract players